The 37th G8 summit was held on May 26–27, 2011, in Deauville, France.

Previous G8 summits have been hosted by France in locations which include Rambouillet (1975); Versailles (1982); Grande Arche, Paris (1989); Lyon (1996);  and Évian-les-Bains (2003).

Overview 

The Group of Six (G6) was an unofficial forum which brought together the heads of the richest industrialized countries: France, Germany, Italy, Japan, the United Kingdom and the United States starting in 1976. The Group of Seven (G7), meeting for the first time in 1979, was formed with the addition of Canada. Hence, The Group of Eight (G8), meeting for the first time in 1997, was formed with the addition of Russia. In addition, the President of the European Commission has been formally included in summits since 1981.  The summits were not meant to be linked formally with wider international institutions; and in fact, a mild rebellion against the stiff formality of other international meetings was a part of the genesis of cooperation between France's President Giscard d'Estaing and West Germany's Chancellor Helmut Schmidt as they conceived the initial summit of the Group of Six (G6) in 1975.

The G8 summits have inspired widespread debates, protests and demonstrations; and the two- or three-day event becomes more than the sum of its parts, elevating the participants, the issues and the venue as focal points for activist pressure.

The form and functions of the G8 were reevaluated as the G20 summits evolved into the premier forum for discussing, planning and monitoring international economic
cooperation.   The "new G8" is refocusing on the subjects of common interest to the G8 countries, including geopolitical and security issues.

The forum continues to be in a process of transformation.

Leaders at the summit 

The G8 is an unofficial annual forum for the leaders of Canada, the European Commission, France, Germany, Italy, Japan, Russia, the United Kingdom and the United States.

The 37th G8 summit was the last summit for French President Nicolas Sarkozy, Italian Prime Minister Silvio Berlusconi, Japanese Prime Minister Naoto Kan and Dmitry Medvedev as President of Russia (Medvedev would return to the 38th G8 summit the following year as Prime Minister of Russia, leading Russian delegates in place for the newly elected President Vladimir Putin).

Participants 

These summit participants represent the current core members of the international forum:

Priorities 

Traditionally, the host country of the G8 summit sets the agenda for negotiations, but world events caused the list of topics to expand, including such issues such as the Fukushima nuclear accident the European sovereign debt crisis, the conflict in Libya, Iran's nuclear programme,  Syria's crackdown on pro-democracy protests, and the selection of a new managing director for the International Monetary Fund.

Issues 

The summit is a venue for resolving differences among its members. As a practical matter, the summit was also conceived as an opportunity for its members to give each other mutual encouragement in the face of difficult economic decisions.  The G8 has become a forum for political and strategic discussions, and as a caucus within the G20.

Schedule and Agenda 

The agenda for the summit included some issues which remained unresolved from previous summits.  French general priorities included:
 New common challenges: the Internet, innovation, green growth and a sustainable economy, and nuclear safety
 The 'Arab Springs': a partnership for democracy
 Strengthening the partnership with Africa: a long-term vision
 Peace and security: traditional themes of the G8

Some of the specific topics on the agenda were:
 Afghanistan;
 G8 + Broader Middle East and North Africa (BMENA);
 The Internet: new challenges
 Non-proliferation of Weapons of Mass Destruction
 The G8's Partnership with Africa
 Transatlantic Cocaine Trafficking
 Counter-terrorism
 G8 political and security issues

Citizens' responses and authorities' counter-responses 

Protest groups and other activists were expected to make a showing at the summit. The slogan G8 dégage ("G8 Go Away") was a recurring element of the demonstrations.

Protesters expressed their concerns about capitalism and what they perceive as the imperialism of western liberal democracies. The demonstrators are widely understood to be against globalisation.

Accomplishments 

This annual gathering of international leaders is an international event which is observed and reported by news media; and the G8's relevance and accomplishments are continuing topics of discussion.  The event brings leaders together not so they can dream up quick fixes, but to talk and think about them together.

The 2011 summit meeting was marked by what the G8 called the "Deauville Partnership" with the people of North Africa.  As a start, $20 billion were pledged in support for Tunisian and Egyptian reforms due to the Arab Spring.

Security 

Security planning was designed to ensure that the summit's formal agenda can remain the primary focus of the attendees' discussions; but effectively this meant converting the seaside resort into a fortress for the G8.

Budget 

In 2010, President Sarkozy projected that the summits in Deauville and  Cannes would cost "ten times less" than the preceding Canadian summits.

Business opportunity 

For some, the G8 summit became a profit-generating event. For example, the G8 Summit magazines have been published under the auspices of the host nations for distribution to all attendees since 1998.

According to the Mayor of Deauville, "Our main interest is the economic implications."

Gallery

Core G8 participants

See also 

 E-G8 Forum
 2011 G20 Cannes summit
 Intergovernmental Panel on Climate Change
 United Nations Framework Convention on Climate Change

Notes

References 
 Reinalda, Bob and Bertjan Verbeek. (1998).  Autonomous Policy Making by International Organizations. London: Routledge. ; ;   OCLC 39013643

External links 

 G8 Information Centre
 Graphic: G20 is not simply the 20 largest economies
 Official website. NB: No official website is created for any G7 summit prior to 1995 -- see the 21st G7 summit.

2011
G8 summit
G8 summit 2011
G8 summit 2011
G8 summit
G8 summit
21st century in Normandy
Deauville
May 2011 events in Europe